Essential Steve Earle is the second compilation album by American singer-songwriter Steve Earle. The album was released in 1993.

Track listing
All songs written by Steve Earle unless otherwise noted.

References

1993 greatest hits albums
Steve Earle compilation albums
MCA Records compilation albums